Hans-Heinrich Lieb is emeritus professor at the Freie Universität Berlin and is the originator of the linguistic framework of Integrational linguistics (IL).

Info  
Address - Habelschwerdter Allee 45 14195 Berlin

Notes

External links
 Homepage of Hans-Heinrich Lieb

Institut / Einrichtungen 
 Institut für Deutsche und Niederländische Philologie
 IZ Europäische Sprachen

Living people
Linguists from Germany
Academic staff of the Free University of Berlin
Year of birth missing (living people)